Amauropelta conformis, synonym Thelypteris conformis, is a species of fern in the family Thelypteridaceae. It is endemic to Ecuador. Its natural habitat is subtropical or tropical moist montane forests. It is threatened by habitat loss.

References

 

Thelypteridaceae
Endemic flora of Ecuador
Vulnerable flora of South America
Taxonomy articles created by Polbot
Taxobox binomials not recognized by IUCN